The Battle of Sablat or Záblatí occurred on 10 June 1619, during the Bohemian period of the Thirty Years' War. The battle was fought between a Roman Catholic Imperial army led by Charles Bonaventure de Longueval, Count of Bucquoy and the Protestant army of Ernst von Mansfeld.

When Mansfeld was on his way to reinforce general Hohenlohe, who was besieging Budějovice,  Buquoy intercepted Mansfeld near the small village of Záblatí, about  km NW of Budějovice, and brought him to battle. Mansfeld suffered defeat, losing at least 1,500 infantry and his baggage train. As a result, the Bohemians had to lift the siege of Budějovice.

Primary sources
 Parker, Geoffrey. The Thirty Years' War, (London/New York: Routledge, 1984. ). 340 pages.

1619 in Europe
Conflicts in 1619
Battles of the Thirty Years' War
Battles involving the Holy Roman Empire
Battles in Bohemia
Battles involving Bohemia
Bohemian Revolt
History of the South Bohemian Region